This is a list of schools in the Metropolitan Borough of Barnsley in the English county of South Yorkshire.

State-funded schools

Primary schools

All Saints Academy, Darfield
Athersley North Primary School, Athersley
Athersley South Primary School, Athersley
Barugh Green Primary School, Barugh Green
Birdwell Primary School, Birdwell
Birkwood Primary School, Cudworth
Brierley CE Primary School, Brierley
Burton Road Primary School, Old Town
Carlton Primary Academy, Carlton
Carrfield Primary Academy, Bolton upon Dearne
Cawthorne CE Primary School, Cawthorne
Cherry Dale Primary School, Cudworth
Churchfield Primary School, Cudworth
Darton Primary School, Darton
Dodworth St John the Baptist CE Primary Academy, Dodworth
The Ellis CE Primary School, Hemingfield
Elsecar Holy Trinity CE Primary Academy, Elsecar
The Forest Academy, Kendray
Gawber Primary School, Gawber
Goldthorpe Primary Academy, Goldthorpe
Gooseacre Primary Academy, Thurnscoe
Greenfield Primary School, Hoyland
Heather Garth Primary Academy, Bolton upon Dearne
High View Primary Learning Centre, Wombwell
Highgate Primary Academy, Goldthorpe
The Hill Primary Academy, Thurnscoe
Holy Rood RC Primary School, Shaw Lands
Holy Trinity RC and CE School, Athersley
Hoyland Common Primary School, Hoyland Common
Hoyland Springwood Primary School, Hoyland
Hoylandswaine Primary School, Hoylandswaine
Hunningley Primary School, Kendray
Joseph Locke Primary School, Shaw Lands
Jump Primary School, Jump
Keresforth Primary School, Dodworth
Kexborough Primary School, Darton
Kings Oak Primary Learning Centre, Wombwell
Lacewood Primary School, Bolton upon Dearne
Ladywood Primary School, Grimethorpe
Laithes Primary School, Smithies
Mapplewell Primary School, Mapplewell
Meadstead Primary Academy, Royston
Milefield Primary School, Grimethorpe
The Mill Academy, Worsbrough
Millhouse Primary School, Millhouse Green
Oakhill Primary Academy, Ardsley
Oakwell Rise Primary Academy, Measborough Dike
Outwood Primary Academy Darfield, Darfield
Outwood Primary Academy Littleworth Grange, Lundwood
Oxspring Primary School, Oxspring
Parkside Primary Academy, Royston
Penistone St John's Primary School, Penistone
Queens Road Academy, Hoyle Mill
Royston St John Baptist CE Primary School, Royston
Sacred Heart RC Primary School, Goldthorpe
St Helen's RC Primary School, Hoyland
St Helen's Primary Academy, Monk Bretton
St Mary's CE Primary School, Pogmoor
St Michael and All Angels RC Primary School, Wombwell
Sandhill Primary School, Great Houghton
Shafton Primary Academy, Shafton
Shawlands Primary School, Shaw Lands
Silkstone Common Junior and Infant School, Silkstone Common
Silkstone Primary School, Silkstone
Springvale Primary School, Penistone
Summer Lane Primary School, Pogmoor
Summerfields Primary Academy, Royston
Tankersley St Peter's CE Primary School, Tankersley
Thurgoland CE Primary School, Thurgoland
Thurlstone Primary School, Thurlstone
Upperwood Academy, Darfield
Ward Green Primary School, Worsbrough
Wellgate Primary School, Mapplewell 
West Meadows Primary School, Hoyland
Wilthorpe Primary School, Wilthorpe
Wombwell Park Street Primary School, Wombwell
Worsbrough Bank End Primary School, Worsbrough
Worsbrough Common Primary School, Worsbrough

Secondary schools

Astrea Academy Dearne, Goldthorpe
Barnsley Academy, Kendray
Darton Academy, Darton
Holy Trinity Catholic and Church of England School, Athersley
Horizon Community College, Shaw Lands
Kirk Balk Academy, Hoyland
Netherwood Academy, Wombwell
Outwood Academy Carlton, Carlton
Outwood Academy Shafton, Shafton
Penistone Grammar School, Penistone
Trinity Academy St Edwards, Barnsley Town Centre

Special and alternative schools
Greenacre School, Kingstone
Springwell Alternative Academy, Athersley
Springwell Special Academy, Athersley

Further education
Barnsley College
Northern College for Residential and Community Adult Education

Independent schools

Special and alternative schools
Dove School, Staincross
Park House School, Tankersley
The Robert Ogden School, Thurnscoe

References

Barnsley
 
Schools